Ma-Li Wong is an Australian researcher in the fields of psychiatry and pharmacogenomics, with a particular focus on major depression. She is head of the Pharmacogenomics Research Program in the Mind and Brain Theme at the South Australian Health and Medical Research Institute, as well as Strategic Professor of Psychiatry at Flinders University.

Born in Hong Kong, Wong was raised in Brazil. She lived in the United States for over 25 years, during which time she was trained in psychiatry at the Albert Einstein College of Medicine and Yale University, among other places. She is married to medical researcher Julio Licinio, with whom she has regularly collaborated on research since the 1980s.

References

External links
Faculty page at Flinders University

Living people
Australian women psychiatrists
Hong Kong emigrants to Australia
Academic staff of Flinders University
Albert Einstein College of Medicine alumni
Yale University alumni
Year of birth missing (living people)